Colegio Cristóbal Colón (Christopher Columbus School) may refer to:
Colegio Cristóbal Colón (El Salvador)
Colegio Cristóbal Colón (Mexico)